Cvijetin Blagojević (born April 10, 1955) is a Bosnian Serb football manager and former player.

Playing career
Born in Lopare, during his playing career he played in the Yugoslav First League clubs FK Sloboda Tuzla and Red Star Belgrade before deciding to continue his career abroad, playing first in Greece with Egaleo F.C., and then with Swedish club Vasalunds IF, and Portuguese CS Marítimo.

Managerial career
After retiring, he became a football manager. He initially coached Šumarice and Plavi tim in Sweden, and then returned to the region of former-Yugoslavia where he coached Železnik, Kozara Gradiška, Radnički Obrenovac, Red Star Belgrade youth team, Radnički Pirot, Radnik Surdulica and Drina Zvornik.

References

External links
 Na današnji dan rođen Cvijetin Blagojević at mojacrvenazvezda.net
 
 

1955 births
Living people
People from Lopare
Serbs of Bosnia and Herzegovina
Association football midfielders
Yugoslav footballers
Bosnia and Herzegovina footballers
FK Sloboda Tuzla players
Red Star Belgrade footballers
Egaleo F.C. players
Vasalunds IF players
C.S. Marítimo players
Yugoslav First League players
Super League Greece players
Primeira Liga players
Yugoslav expatriate footballers
Expatriate footballers in Greece
Yugoslav expatriate sportspeople in Greece
Expatriate footballers in Sweden
Yugoslav expatriate sportspeople in Sweden
Expatriate footballers in Portugal
Yugoslav expatriate sportspeople in Portugal
Bosnia and Herzegovina football managers
FK Železnik managers
FK Kozara Gradiška managers
FK Radnički Pirot managers
FK Radnik Surdulica managers
FK Drina Zvornik managers
Premier League of Bosnia and Herzegovina managers
Red Star Belgrade non-playing staff